Brown-eyed Susan is a common name for several plants and may refer to:

 Rudbeckia hirta, flowering plant in the sunflower family, native North America and naturalized in China
 Rudbeckia triloba, native to the United States